(pl. ) was the position title for a female guard in Nazi concentration camps. Of the 50,000 guards who served in the concentration camps, approximately 5,000 were women. In 1942, the first female guards arrived at Auschwitz and Majdanek from Ravensbrück. The year after, the Nazis began conscripting women because of a shortage of male guards. In the context of these camps, the German position title of  translates to (female) "overseer" or "attendant". Later female guards were dispersed to Bolzano (1944–1945), Kaiserwald-Riga (1943–44), Mauthausen (March – May 1945), Stutthof (1942–1945), Vaivara (1943–1944), Vught (1943–1944), and at Nazi concentration camps, subcamps, work camps, detention camps and other posts.

Recruitment

Female guards were generally from the lower to middle class and had no relevant work experience; their occupational background varied: one source mentions former matrons, hairdressers, tramcar-conductresses, opera singers or retired teachers. Volunteers were recruited via advertisements in German newspapers asking for women to show their love for the Reich and join the SS-Gefolge ("SS-Retinue", a Schutzstaffel (SS) support and service organisation for women). Additionally, some were conscripted based on data in their SS files. Adolescent enrollment in the League of German Girls acted as a vehicle of indoctrination for many of the women. At one of the post-war hearings,  Herta Haase-Breitmann-Schmidt, head female overseer, claimed that her female guards were not full-fledged SS women. Consequently, at some tribunals it was disputed whether SS-Helferinnen employed at the camps were official members of the SS, thus leading to conflicting court decisions. Many of them belonged to the Waffen-SS and to the SS-Helferinnen Corps.

Supervision levels and ranks
Female guards were collectively known as SS-Helferin (German: "SS Helper women"). The supervisory levels within the SS-Helferin were as follows: 
Chef Oberaufseherin, "Chief Senior Overseer" [Ravensbrück]
Lagerführerin, "Camp Leader"                                                                                             
Oberaufseherin, "Senior Overseer" 
Erstaufseherin, "First Guard" [Senior Overseer in some satellite camps]
Rapportführerin, "Report Leader"
Arbeitsdienstführerin, "Work Recording Leader"
Arbeitseinsatzführerin, "Work Input Overseers"                                               
Blockführerin, "Block Leader" 
Kommandoführerin, "Work Squad Leader" [Senior Overseer in some satellite camps]
Hundeführerin, "Dog Guide Overseer"                                                                                           
Aufseherin, "Overseer"                                                                       
Arrestführerin, "Arrested Overseer"

Daily life
Relations between SS men and female guards are said to have existed in many of the camps, and Heinrich Himmler had told the SS men to regard the female guards as equals and comrades. At the relatively small Helmbrechts subcamp near Hof, Germany, the camp commandant, Wilhelm Dörr, openly pursued a sexual relationship with the head female overseer Herta Haase-Breitmann-Schmidt.

Corruption was another aspect of the female guard culture. Ilse Koch, known as "The Witch of Buchenwald", was married to the camp commandant, Karl Koch. Both were rumored to have embezzled millions of Reichsmark, for which Karl Koch was convicted and executed by the Nazis a few weeks before Buchenwald was liberated by the U.S. Army; however, Ilse was cleared of the charge. Convicted of war crimes, she was sentenced to life imprisonment in 1951.

One apparent exception to the brutal female overseer prototype was Klara Kunig, a camp guard in 1944 who served at Ravensbrück and its subcamp at Dresden-Universelle. The head wardress at the camp pointed out that she was too polite and too kind towards the inmates, resulting in her subsequent dismissal from camp duty in January 1945. Her fate has been unknown since 13 February 1945, the date of the allied firebombing of Dresden.

Camps, names and ranks

Near the end of the war, women were forced from factories in the German Labour Exchange and sent to training centres. Women were also trained on a smaller scale at the camps of Neuengamme; Auschwitz I, II, and III; Flossenbürg (as well as Dresden-Goehle, Holleischen and Zwodau); Gross Rosen (as well as its satellites in Langenbielau, Ober Hohenelbe and Parschnitz); Stutthof, as well as a few at Mauthausen. Most of these women came from the regions around the camps. In 1944, the first female overseers were stationed at the satellite camps belonging to Neuengamme, Dachau, Mauthausen, a very few at Natzweiler-Struthof, and none at the Mittelbau-Dora complex until March 1945.

Twenty-eight  served in Vught, some at Buchenwald, 60 in Bergen-Belsen, one at Dachau overseeing the brothel, more than 30 in Mauthausen (January 1945–May 1945), 30 at Majdanek, around 200 at Auschwitz and its subcamps, 140 at Sachsenhausen and its subcamps, 158 trained at Neuengamme, 47 trained at Stutthof, compared to 958 who served in Ravensbrück, 561 in the Flossenbürg complex, and over 800 in the Gross Rosen. Many female supervisors were trained and/or worked at subcamps in Germany, Poland, France, Austria, and Czechoslovakia.

The head overseer at Allendorf was SS-Oberaufseherin/Erstaufseherin Kaethe Hoern (September 1944–March 1945) while her assistant was SS-Stellvertretende Oberaufseherin Hildegard K.; in Auschwitz Oberaufseherin Johanna Langefeld (March 1942–October 1942), Lagerfuehrerin Maria Mandl (October 1942–November 1944), Stellvertetende Oberaufseherin Emma Zimmer (1942–43), Stellvertretende Lagerfuehrerin Margot Dreschel (late 1943–November 1944), Arbeitsdienstfuehrerin Elisabeth Hasse, Oberaufseherin Elisabeth Volkenrath (November 1944–January 1945), and Rapportfuehrerin Irma Grese (1944–of Hungarian Jewish women's compound under Mandl, Dreschel and Hasse), Mandl herself commanded all the SS women within Auschwitz-Birkenau. Grese and Volkenrath were convicted of war crimes and hanged on 13 December 1945; Mandl was hanged on 24 January 1948.
At Barth Lagerfuehrerin Irmgard Reissner (1944-April 1945),  Ruth Neudeck, (March 1945–May 1945), Stellvertretende Lagerfuehrerin Gerda Langner, and Kommandoführerin Gertrud Herrmann, in Belzig head female guard was Hedwig Ullrich (Summer 1944–April 1945).
In Bergen-Belsen the three head overseers were Oberaufseherin Elisabeth Volkenrath (February 1945–April 1945), Rapportführerin Hildegard Gollasch, while Herta Ehlert served an additional deputy wardress and Irma Grese (January/February 1945–April 1945) was Kommandoführerin alongside Juana Bormann.  At the Gross-Rosen annex camp at Bernsdorf (Bernartice), Maria Mühl was Kommandofuehrerin under Lagerfuehrerin Else Hawlik, who commanded all of the Trautenau Ring labor camps.  At the Gross-Rosen annex camp at Breslau-Hundsfeld (Wroclaw Psie Pole) the Kommandofuehrerin was Emilie Kowa and another high female ranking officer-Margarete Schueller.
Johanna Wisotzki was Oberaufseherin in Bromberg-Ost (Bydgoszcz East) from June 1944 until January/February 1945 along with Gerda Steinhoff, while Ilse Koch was appointed (unofficially) head female guard at Buchenwald, even though the camp had very few female prisoners. Koch was convicted of war crimes; she committed suicide in Aichach women's prison on 1 September 1967.
At Christianstadt, a Gross-Rosen satellite in Silesia, Emilie Harms was in charge of the camp; her assistant was Stellvertretende Kommandofuehrerin Lina Pohl. In the Danzig Holm subcamp Stellvertretende Oberaufseherin Gerda Steinhoff was second-in-command of all the female overseers and prisoners (October 1944–December 1944); in the Dora Mittelbau satellite in Gross-Werther, this was handled by Lagerfuhrerin Erna Petermann.
At the Ravensbrück/Flossenbürg subcamp at Dresden Universelle, Erstaufseherin Ida Guhl and Erstaufseherin Charlotte Hanakam were chief wardresses (1944–April 1945), and in Flossenbürg subcamp at Dresden-Goehle, this rank was given to several women, including Erstaufseherin Gertrud Schaefer and Margarethe de Hueber (1944); Erstaufseherin Gertrud Becker oversaw the Flossenbürg satellite in Hainichen (October 1944–April 1945), Erstaufseherin Dora Lange and later Erstaufseherin Gertrud Weniger (1944–1945) commanded Oederan.
At the Gross-Rosen subcamp in Gabersdorf, Kommandoführerin Charlotte Ressel was chief, and at the main camp Oberaufseherin Jane Bernigau was chief among all of the subcamps women guard personnel (800); in the Grünberg (Zielona Góra) satellite, Lagerführerin Anna Fiebeg (June 1944–January 1945) served as chief overseer, while Stellvetretende Lagerführerinnen Anna Jahn and Hela Milefski Replacement Camp Overseers, Female.
At Gräben (Grabina/Strzegom (PL), Kommandofuehrerin Katharina Reimann was head woman guard and Margarete Hentschel was her assistant as a Rapportfuehrerin; in Graeflish-Roehrsdorf, Silesia, Kommandoführerin Gertrud Sauer was in charge of the women's camp; and at the Gruschwitz-Neusalz subcamp of Gross Rosen Helene Obuch (1943–June 1944), then Kommandoführerin Elisabeth Gersch (June 1944–January 1945) was in charge, and at Hamburg-Wandsbek, Oberaufseherin Annemie von der Huelst was in charge, followed by her second-in-command, Kommandoführerin Loni Gutzeit.  At Hamburg-Sasel, Kommandofuehrerin Ida Roemer was the head female guard.
Helmbrechts was a subcamp of Floßenbürg built near Hof, Germany. Originally, Erstaufseherin Martha Dell' Antonia (Summer 1944–?) served there as head female guard over 22 female guards. In late 1944 she was replaced by the Commandant's (Doerr's) mistress, Herta Haase-Breitmann, who was originally a Kommandofuehrerin.
 In Holleischen Anna Schmidt, Dora Lange was senior overseer along with Elfriede Tribus.
Kratzau II in Czechoslovakia were overseen by Kommandofuehrerin Elsa Hennrich while a certain Denner (or Dinner) commanded Kratzau I; Lenzing by Oberaufseherin Margarete Freinberg(er) (November 1944–May 1945).
Majdanek and Lublin-Alterflughafen camps were headed by Oberaufsherin Else Ehrich (October 1942–June 1944), her immediate assistant, Rapportführerin and Stellvertretende Oberaufseherin Hermine Braunsteiner, and further deputies Else Weber and Elisabeth Knoblich. Knoblich was nicknamed "Halt die Klappe!" ("Shut up!") and Hermine Braunsteiner was deported from the United States to Germany in 1973 and died in 1999.
At the Mittelsteine concentration camp the head overseer was Kommandoführerin Käthe Jenesch and SS-Aufseherinnen Philomena Locker (reportedly sentenced after the War to seven years' imprisonment), Charlotte Neugebauer, and a Fraulein Schneider, (first name unknown). At Merzdorf Erna Rinke was Chief Overseer (Oberaufseherin).
In Obernheide, Kommandoführerin Gertrud Heise was chief over seven (known) SS women (September 1944–April 1945), and in Plaszow, Oberaufseherin Elsa Ehrich, Anna Gerwing (as Rapportführerin) and Kommandoführerin Alice Orlowski among another unknown women.
Ravensbrück was the central and largest training ground for female guards. The first Oberaufseherin was Margarete Stollberg who organized construction operations at the camp in a very minor capacity until May 1939.  Immediately after the camp was opened Johanna Langefeld became SS-Oberaufseherin (May 1939–March 1942) and Emma Zimmer became her deputy, (SS-Stellvertretende Oberaufseherin) (May 1939–October 1942); Maria Mandl also served during this period as an SS-Kommandoführerin (1939–1940) and Ober-Arrestführerin. of the camp bunker (1940–March 1942) while Gertrud Rabestein served as SS-Blockführerin of the Punishment Barrack and SS-Leiterin of the SS-Hundeführerinnen (1939–1941) and Gertrud Ida Schreiter served as an SS-Hundeführerin and SS-Kommandoführerin.  After Langefeld was assigned to Auschwitz I during March 1942, Maria Mandl became SS-Oberaufseherin (March 1942–October 1942), followed by Johanna Langefeld, who once again served at Ravensbrück until the summer of 1943.  During this period SS-Rapportführerinnen included Else Ehrich (1942) and Margot Dreschel, and Ober-arrestführerin Dorothea Binz, while Erika Boeddeker (1942), Edith Fräde (1942), Sophie Gode, and Wilhelmine Pielen (1942–1943) served as Blockführerinnen and/or Stellvertretende Blockführerinnen.  With the creation of Abteilung IIIa, the Labor Department in Ravensbrück, several SS officers were placed in command there, along with SS-Arbeitsdienstführerin Rosel Laurenzen (later married Dürichen) and her assistant, SS-Arbeitseinsatzführerin Gertrud Schöber (later married Steisslinger); during 1943 Laurenzen was relieved from her post and Gertrud Ida Schreiter became SS-Arbeitsdienstführerin. After deputy Leader Emma Zimmer was called to Auschwitz II in October 1942, along with Mandl and Margot Dreschel, Margarete Gallinat became deputy Oberaufseherin under Langefeld. During the summer of 1943, Gallinat was moved as SS-Oberaufseherin to the Vught concentration camp in the Netherlands and Langefeld was arrested by the SS.  Camp authorities promoted longtime Aufseherin Anne Klein-Plaubel to Chief Senior Overseer (Chef Oberaufseherin) of Ravensbrck during August 1943, assisted by Stellvertretende Oberaufseherin Dorothea Binz and under them were SS-Scharführerin Christel Jankowsky, SS-Ober-arrestführerin Margarete Mewes, and SS-Blockführerinnen Henny Gottwitz (Block 3) and Ulla Jürß (1943–1944).  During March 1944 Wilhelmine Pielen returned to Ravensbrück from Neubrandenburg and became assistant to Leader Binz until her transfer to Konigsberg-Neumark during October 1944.  During this time, Arbeitsdienstführerin Gertrud Ida Schreiter (born Kaufmann) was the female Leader of the Labor Department, and her second-in-commands were Arbeitseinsatzführerinnen Greta Bösel (born Müller)–in 1944 and a certain Helevead (or Hollevaed) also served in Department IIIa; additionally, Helene Massar was a Kommandoführerin of the sewing shop at the camp until 1945.  In the late autumn of 1944, Auschwitz-Birkenau Aufseherin Luise Brunner was installed as Chef Oberaufseherin at Ravensbrück.  Under Brunner was Oberaufseherin Binz, Arbeitsdienstführerin Schreiter, Arbeitsdienstführerin Ilse Vettermann, Stellvertretende Oberaufseherin Else Krippner, SS-Stellvertretende Oberaufseherin Wilhelmine Pielen (after her return from Konigsberg-Neumark in February/March 1945-she replaced Krippner) and Arbeitseinsatzführerinnen Greta Bösel and Hollevaed-were around 144 SS-Aufseherinnen (SS-Overseers), including Report Overseers (Rapportführerinnen) Knack, Olga Nickel (who began service prior to the summer of 1942) and Hildegard Knop. The Kommandoführerinnen during 1944/1945 included Elisabeth Kammer, Emma Lankes, Helene Massar, and Hildegard Z while Blockfuhrerinnen were Ulla Jürß {until autumn 1944}, Ruth Neudeck (summer-autumn 1944), Elfriede Mohnecke (spring 1945), Martha Krüger (of Barrack 23), Rosalie Leimböck (until autumn 1944), Margarete Steigüber, Emmi Steinbeck, and Frieda Wötzel-Drehmann (1944).  Else Grabner was also the head of the female Ravensbrück subcamp as Oberaufseherin (Chief Wardress), then Lagerleiterin (Camp Leader).  Binz and Boesel were convicted of war crimes and hanged on 2 May 1947.
Rochlitz was headed by Ertaufseherin Marianne Essmann.
In St. Lambrecht it was Jane Bernigau (1942–1944), while at Stutthof there was Oberaufseherin Anna Scharbert promoted to chief female overseer after her time in Ravensbruck, Majdanek and Auschwitz, while at Theresienstadt this was given to Hildegard Neumann and Oberaufseherin Elisabeth Schmidt in the 'Small Fortress' camp.
Erstaufseherin Ruth Closius headed Uckermark along with her assistant, SS-Stellvertretende Oberaufseherin Elfriede Mohnecke (January 1945–March 1945); Oberaufseherin Margarete Gallinat (Maria) (1943–1944) and later Oberaufseherin Gertrud Weiniger (summer–autumn 1944) oversaw Vught, Kommandofehrerin Susanne Hille was head female guard at Unterluess (or Vuterluss) (September 1944–April 1945). Oberaufseherin Fraulein Schneider, and later Anneliese Unger oversaw the Flossenbürg subcamp at Zwodau (June 1944–May 1945). 
Dzierżązna, Łódź Voivodeship SS Aufseherin Sydonia Bayer {b. 12 December 1903–tried 6 September 1945; executed Lodz Poland 12 November 1945]
In researching his maternal German kin, American historian James L. Cabot found that two of his distant relations were overseers – Maria Kleinschmidt, an operative at Neuengamme, and Charlotte Kleinschmidt (née Peters), whose exact camp service is unknown.

Prisoner Olga Lengyel, who in her memoir, Five Chimneys, wrote that selections in the women’s camp were made by SS Aufseherin Elisabeth Hasse and Irma Grese.  Other survivors accused Juana Bormann, Elisabeth Volkenrath, Elisabeth Ruppert and Margot Dreschel for the same crimes.

Later events

In 1996, a story broke in Germany about Margot Pietzner (married name Kunz), a former Aufseherin from Ravensbrück, the Belzig subcamp and a subcamp at Wittenberg. She was originally sentenced to death by a Soviet court, but it was commuted to a life sentence, and she was released in 1956. In the early 1990s, at the age of 74, Pietzner was awarded the title "Stalinist victim" and given 64,350 Deutsche Marks (32,902 Euros). Many historians argued that she had lied and did not deserve the money. She had, in fact, served time in a German prison which was overseen by the Soviets, but she was imprisoned because she had served at three concentration camps.

The only female guard to tell her story to the public was Herta Bothe, who served as a guard at Ravensbrück in 1942, then at Stutthof, Bromberg-Ost subcamp, and finally in Bergen-Belsen. She received ten years' imprisonment and was released in the mid-1950s. In a rare interview recorded in 1999, Bothe was asked if she regretted being a guard in a concentration camp. Her response was, "What do you mean? ... I made a mistake, no... The mistake was that it was a concentration camp, but I had to go to it—otherwise I would have been put into it myself, that was my mistake." Though Bothe claimed that refusal of the position of guard would have seen her placed in the camp herself – an explanation given by many female ex-guards – it was unlikely to have been true, as records from the time showed some new recruits leaving their positions at Ravensbrück, facing no recorded negative consequences for doing so.

In 2006, 84-year-old San Francisco resident Elfriede Rinkel was deported by the US Justice Department to Germany; Rinkel had worked at Ravensbrück from June 1944 to April 1945, and had used an SS-trained dog in the camp. She had hidden her secret for more than 60 years from her family, friends and Jewish-German husband Fred. Rinkel immigrated to the US in 1959 seeking a better life, and had omitted Ravensbrück from the list of residences supplied on her visa application. In Germany, Rinkel did not face criminal charges, with the expiry of the statute of limitations meaning that only murder allegations could be tried after such a length of time. The case continued to be examined until Rinkel's death in 2018.

Notes

See also
SS-Totenkopfverbände#Concentration camp personnel

References
Aroneanu, Eugene, ed. Inside the Concentration Camps Trans. Thomas Whissen. New York: Praeger, 1996.
Brown, Daniel Patrick, The Camp Women. The Female Auxiliaries Who Assisted the SS in Running the Nazi Concentration Camp System. Atglen, Pa.: Schiffer Publishing Ltd., 2002. 
Hart, Kitty. Return to Auschwitz: The Remarkable Story of a Girl Who Survived the Holocaust. New York: Atheneum, 1983.
 G. Álvarez, Mónica. "Guardianas Nazis. El lado femenino del mal" (Spanish). Madrid: Grupo Edaf, 2012. 
Mailänder, Elissa & Patricia Szobar, eds. Female SS Guards and Workaday Violence: The Majdanek Concentration Camp, 1942-1944. East Lansing, MI: Michigan State University Press, 2015.

External links
Article on female Nazi war criminals

 
Nazi concentration camp occupations